Henry Reed may refer to:

People
 Henry Reed (American football) (born 1948), American football player
 Henry Reed (cricketer) (1892–1963), English cricketer
 Henry Reed (merchant) (1806–1880), British merchant, philanthropist and evangelist
 Henry Reed (musician) (1884–1968), Appalachian fiddler and banjoist, associated with folklorist Alan Jabbour
 Henry Reed (poet) (1914–1986), British poet
 Henry Reed (Wisconsin legislator), Democratic member of the Wisconsin State Assembly
 Henry Armstrong Reed (1858–1876), killed at Battle of the Little Bighorn, nephew of George Armstrong Custer
 Henry Byron Reed (1855–1896), Member of Parliament
 Herbert Reed (British Army soldier) (Henry Herbert Reed, died 1940), British sailor, George Cross recipient
 Henry Hope Reed (1808–1854), American educator
 Henry Hope Reed Jr. (1915–2013), American architecture critic and preservationist
 Henry Thomas Reed (1846–1924), U.S. federal judge
 Henry Reed (I Know Why the Caged Bird Sings), a student mentioned in Maya Angelou's autobiography I Know Why the Caged Bird Sings

Fictional characters
 Henry Reed (character), in children's novels by Keith Robertson

See also
Henry Reid, former director of UCLA’s willed body program
Henry Read (1890–1963), Anglican bishop in North India
Henry English Read (1824–1868), American politician
Henry Reade (1840–1884), English first-class cricketer, clergyman and educator
Henry Reade (FRS) (c. 1716–1762), English academic and government official
Harry Reid (disambiguation)